Philip C. Hammond (died 2008) was an American archaeologist. He led excavations at a number of sites in the West Bank, Jordan and Egypt, notably Nag Hammadi, Tel Rumeida, and Petra.

Jeffrey R. Chadwick described Hammond as the “Lion of Petra”.

Biography
After serving in World War II, he received a Ph.D. in archaeology from Yale University in 1957. He taught at Lycoming College, at the Princeton Theological Seminary, and at Brandeis University. In 1969 he joined the University of Utah.

References

American archaeologists
Yale University alumni
Year of birth missing
2008 deaths